Cameroon competed in the 2008 Summer Olympics held in Beijing, People's Republic of China from August 8 to August 24, 2008.

Medalists

Athletics

Men
Field events

Women
Track & road events

Field events

Boxing

Cameroon qualified three boxers for the Olympic boxing tournament. Mulema qualified in the welterweight class at the 1st AIBA African Olympic Boxing Qualifying Tournament. Essomba and Mahaman both qualified at the second continental tournament.

Football

Men's tournament

Roster

Group play

Quarterfinals

Judo

Rowing

Men

Swimming

Men

Women

Table tennis

Weightlifting

Wrestling

Women's freestyle

References

Nations at the 2008 Summer Olympics
2008
Summer Olympics